Robert Glaudini (born December 6, 1941) is an American actor, playwright, director and teacher.

Career
He wrote a hit off-Broadway play Jack Goes Boating which was directed by Peter DuBois and starred Philip Seymour Hoffman, John Ortiz, Daphne Rubin-Vega and Beth Cole.  Press for the play was extremely positive, leading to a movie directed by Hoffman that was released in September 2010. Glaudini's  play Vengeance is the Lord's premiered in Boston at the Huntington Theatre Company in November 2010.

Personal life
Glaudini resides in New York City. He has three daughters, Kathleen, Isabella, and Lola Glaudini.

Plays
Vengeance is the Lord's
Jack Goes Boating
A View from 151st Street
The Claiming Race
The Poison Tree
Sickness of Youth
The Identical Same Temptation
Dutch Heart of Man

Filmography
Cowboy Mouth (1971)
Mortadella (1972) as Georgie (uncredited)
Angel City (1976)
Chameleon (1978) as Chameleon
Parasite (1982) as Dr. Paul Dean
Wavelength (1983) as Dr. Wolf
The Alchemist (1983) as DelGatto
Grunt! the Wrestling Movie (1985) as Dr. Tweed
Mississippi Burning (1988) as Agent Nash
Cutting Class (1989) as Shultz
Homer and Eddie (1989) as Robber #2
Bugsy (1991) as Dominic
It's Nothing Personal (1993, TV Movie)
NYPD Blue (1999, TV Series) as Jimmy Mayo
The Princess Diaries (2001) as Consulate Valet Adolpho
Coastlines (2002) as Henry

References

External links

Living people
American male film actors
American writers of Italian descent
American male dramatists and playwrights
1941 births
20th-century American male actors
21st-century American male actors
21st-century American dramatists and playwrights
21st-century American male writers
Male actors from New Orleans
Writers from New Orleans